Lake Lillinonah  is a manmade lake located in Fairfield, Litchfield and New Haven counties of Western Connecticut, approximately  northeast of New York City. It is the second largest lake in Connecticut, smaller only than Candlewood Lake.  The lake is bordered by six towns: Brookfield, Bridgewater, Newtown, New Milford, Roxbury, and Southbury.  It was formed in 1955 by impoundment of the Housatonic River and the Shepaug River by the Shepaug Dam which was built by the Connecticut Light and Power Company. Some of the most expensive real estate in the Greater Danbury area is located on the shores of the lake, in the towns of Brookfield, Bridgewater and Newtown.

References

External links 
 www.lakelillinonahauthority.org
 www.friendsofthelake.org

Reservoirs in Connecticut
Lakes of Fairfield County, Connecticut
Tourist attractions in Fairfield County, Connecticut
Lakes of Litchfield County, Connecticut